Bagahi is a village development committee in Parsa District in the Narayani Zone of southern Nepal. At the time of the 2011 Nepal census it had a population of 6,570 people living in 964 individual households.

References

Populated places in Parsa District